Chorlton-cum-Hardy is a suburban area of Manchester, England,  southwest of the city centre. Chorlton ward had a population of 14,138 at the 2011 census, and Chorlton Park 15,147.

By the 9th century, there was an Anglo-Saxon settlement here. In the Middle Ages, improved drainage methods led to population growth. In the late Victorian and Edwardian periods, its rural character made it popular among the middle class. The loss of its railway station, the conversion of larger houses into flats or bedsitters, and significant social housing development to the south of the area changed its character again in the 1970s. However, the existing Manchester Metrolink tram stop called Chorlton was built on the site of that former railway station and from Manchester, it is served by East Didsbury trams and Manchester Airport trams.

Historically, Chorlton was a village on Lancashire's southern border with Cheshire, and a township within the ancient parish of Manchester. It was incorporated into the city of Manchester in 1904. Chorlton borders Stretford, Sale, Didsbury, Withington, and Whalley Range. The River Mersey runs past Chorlton along its southern boundary. The area's eastern boundary has changed since the 19th century because of incorporation into the City of Manchester and division into wards.

History

Toponymy
Chorlton probably means Ceolfrith's farm or settlement from the Old English personal name and tūn, an enclosure, farmstead or village. Hardy is derived from a personal name, Hearda, and ēg, Anglian for island or dry ground in a well-watered land. It has alternatively been suggested that Hardy may mean "by the woods", in reference to the ancient forest of Arden Wood that grew on both sides of the River Mersey in the area. Chorlton was recorded as Chollirton in 1250, Chollerton from 1292 and as Chourton in 1572. It was also noted down as Chawerton on a map of the Salford Hundred by John Speed in 1610.

The ancient hamlets of Chorlton and Hardy, separated by the Chorlton Brook, together with Martledge and Barlow Moor, did not come under the combined name of Chorlton-cum-Hardy (cum is Latin for "with") until the 18th century; local historian Cliff Hayes reports that he can find no mention of Chorlton-cum-Hardy before 1700. The name was adopted by Victorian property developers who arrived in the wake of the coming of the railway in 1880, to distinguish this Chorlton from Chorlton-on-Medlock. The form Chorlton with Hardy was used to some extent from the early 19th century onwards and in the early years of the 20th.

Early history
The district was part of the kingdom of Northumbria from the 7th century, but settlement in the Mersey valley may well have been later. Thomas L. Ellwood suggested 610 AD as the date of founding the settlement, but John Lloyd in his 1972 history considered the period 610 to 900 AD more likely.

The area now known as Chorlton-cum-Hardy comprises the ancient settlements of Chorlton along with Hardy and Barlow to the south on the north side of the Mersey and Martledge, the area around the present-day public library, to the north of Chorlton and Hardy. Chorlton was part of the Withington manor. Hardy was little more than a farm and a few houses, but Barlow was home to the family of that name, who occupied the manor house of Barlow Hall for several hundred years. Barlow Hall was built on a defensive site on rising ground on the north bank of the Mersey. In 1567 the lord of the manor was Alexander Barlow, a staunch recusant who was imprisoned for his beliefs and died in 1584 leaving a son who held similar beliefs. Two of his sons entered the Order of Saint Benedict, one of them, Ambrose Barlow a missionary priest in the Leigh parish, was imprisoned several times and executed for his priesthood in 1641 at Lancaster. Two sons of the papist, Anthony Barlow were charged with treason in the Jacobite rising of 1715. The estate remained with the family until the death of Thomas Barlow in 1773, when it was sold to the Egertons of Tatton Hall. In 1666 Barlow Hall was one of the largest houses paying hearth tax in the Withington manor.

The estimated population in 1640 was 85; in 1714 it was 325. The 1801 census recorded 513 inhabitants, and the 1811 census 619: by 1851 it had increased to 761. The Tithe Commissioners' survey carried out in 1841 provides details of the size and tenure of every piece of land. The tithe map reveals the township had two major landowners: Wilbraham Egerton of Tatton owned 888 acres and George Lloyd 231, the rest was shared between 21 others. Most land was meadow and pasture while 490 acres was arable. Many small landowners owned orchards or market gardens. At this time the village consisted of its ancient halls and scattered farms centred on Chorlton Green and Beech Road and a few buildings on Barlow Moor Road.
Its public houses were the Bowling Green, built in 1693, and the Horse and Jockey, which was licensed in the early 19th century.

Marl had been dug in Martledge since at least 1598; the disused pits filled with water gave the area its common name of the Isles. The Chorlton Brick Company was established there in the early part of the 20th century and continued producing bricks for about forty years. Turf-cutting was a significant industry in Martledge, as well as in the White Moss and Jackson's Moss areas.

Suburban growth

Until the last quarter of the 19th century, Chorlton's population had increased slowly. When the railway reached neighbouring Stretford in 1849, upmarket villas were built on a flood-free area in Edge Lane and High Lane. Wilbraham Road was built in 1869 to connect the Egerton holdings across Withington from Edge Lane to Fallowfield. The Midland Railway built a line from Manchester Central through Chorlton station which opened on 1 January 1880. Over the following decade land close to the station was developed for residential and commercial purposes centred on the Barlow Moor Road/Wilbraham Road crossroads, northeast of the old village centre. Houses built in the 1880s attracted more affluent residents who worked in Manchester city centre to high quality homes in a more rural area.

Irish immigrants came to work in the expanding industries of Manchester, in small-scale horticulture and farming and domestic service. They brought Roman Catholicism, and by the first decade of the 20th century a church (St Augustine's) and convent school had been established on High Lane.

Further growth was aided by the arrival of Manchester Corporation's tramway before the First World War: a terminus was built on Barlow Moor Road a short distance south of the junction with High Lane. Chorltonville was developed as a garden suburb south of Chorlton Brook: the houses are mostly large and semi-detached and individual in design, standing on tree-lined roads. Alexandra Park Aerodrome (1917–24), was Manchester's first major airfield located east of the Midland Railway overbridge on Mauldeth Road West.

After the First World War came a period of residential development to the east of the new village on either side of Wilbraham Road and a council housing estate at Merseybank. The Ashby, a two-seater light car, was produced in Chorlton-cum-Hardy by Victor Ashby and Son from 1922 to 1924.

From the 1960s onwards a council estate at Nell Lane near Southern Cemetery and patchy redevelopment in other areas were completed. There has been immigration particularly from the Indian subcontinent and from Poland; the Polish community arrived in the 1950s and 1960s.

Governance

Civic history
The district was a township of the ancient parish of Manchester in the Salford Hundred of Lancashire. The abolition of Withington's manorial rights in the 1840s meant that local government began to be formalised. Chorlton became part of Chorlton Poor Law Union (named after Chorlton-on-Medlock), then Withington Urban District.

From 1876 to 1894 Chorlton was part of the district administered by the Withington Local Board, and from 1894 to 1904 part of Withington Urban District. It was absorbed into the City of Manchester in August 1904, together with the rest of the urban district. A separate Withington Committee of the city council existed from 1904 until 1914.

Boundary with Trafford
In 1987 the Local Government Boundary Commission for England revised the Manchester and Trafford boundary. The most notable differences for Chorlton-cum-Hardy were that Stretford Stadium was now actually in Stretford, and the Jackson's Boat pub in Sale. Other minor adjustments were made in the Turn Moss area.

Political representation
Since the 1970s both of the wards have been in the Manchester Withington parliamentary constituency. Until then Chorlton ward had been in the Manchester Moss Side parliamentary constituency. In the 2015 general election, the Labour Party's Jeff Smith won the seat with 57.3% of the vote unseating the incumbent Liberal Democrat candidate John Leech. Smith was reelected in the 2019 general election.

Most of Chorlton is divided into two wards, Chorlton and Chorlton Park, which includes the Mersey Bank and Nell Lane estates of south and south-east Chorlton. The remainder of the area is included in the Whalley Range ward. As of 2019, each of the three wards is represented by three Labour councillors.

Geography

The ancient township of Chorlton cum Hardy covered  of low-lying, flat land on the north bank of the River Mersey. In medieval times the district formed part of the Manor of Withington, an area stretching from Longford Park to Debdale Park and south to the Mersey. The highest land is at the south-east end, where it reaches a little over  OD. It is divided by the Chorlton Brook, which runs east to west to its confluence with the Mersey. Chorlton grew north of the brook; the hamlets of Barlow and Hardy were on the southern part, which stretches along the north bank of the Mersey for two miles (3.2 km). Because the county boundary was determined by the course of the Mersey, it traditionally did not exactly follow the river when it changed course: this happened occasionally in the period before improved flood control measures were introduced in the 1840s. The Manchester–Trafford boundary now follows the course of the river. Chorlton is surrounded by Stretford, Sale, Didsbury, Withington, and Whalley Range.

Chorlton's climate is generally temperate, with few extremes of temperature or weather. The mean temperature is slightly above average for the United Kingdom. Annual rainfall and average amount of sunshine are both slightly below the average for the UK.

Between Chorlton Brook and the river, Chorlton Ees Nature Reserve occupies the site of Withington sewage works which closed in 1972. The derelict site was restored and has a network of trails through its grassland and woodland. In the 1970s, gravel was extracted from the Mersey floodplain at Barlow Hall Farm and used in the construction of the M60 motorway. The area around the flooded gravel pit was restored as Chorlton Water Park and is now a Local Nature Reserve.

Chorltonville, a garden village covering , was developed in 1911 south of Chorlton Brook and became the home of professional classes who moved into the area.

Demography

Population change

Economy
Chorlton Precinct, built in the 1970s and rebranded as "The Square" in 2009, has been the subject of redevelopment plans.
In 2010 Manchester City Council's South Manchester Regeneration Team issued an action plan for improvements to the "Chorlton District Centre" for the period 2010 to 2020. It proposes investment in the district aimed at creating "a strong, vibrant and successful centre that supports the local community and has the ability to exploit the economic potential of Metrolink".
Government and public sector employers in Chorlton include the Department for Work and Pensions, Manchester Mental Health and Social Care, and Manchester Social Services. The district centre has a library, three health centres, three dentists and a number of banks.

In 2014 insurance claim figures revealed that the M21 postcode, encompassing Chorlton-cum-Hardy, was the most burgled postcode in the UK with 45.2 claims per 1,000 people.

Landmarks
Manchester City Council designated Chorlton Green a conservation area in 1970 and Chorltonville in 1991.

Chorlton Library

Chorlton Library was built in 1914 to a design by Manchester City Council architect Henry Price. It was funded by a £5000 donation from steel magnate and philanthropist Andrew Carnegie, one of about 3000 Carnegie libraries around the world. The single-story flat-roofed building is constructed of red brick dressed with Portland stone, and is designed in the Edwardian Baroque style.

In 2013 Manchester Council announced plans to sell the library after its reorganisation of the provision of leisure and library services in Chorlton into a new £5.7 million "joint service centre" to be built on the site of Chorlton shopping precinct. Fears that the library would then be demolished were allayed when on 21 August 2013 it was designated a Grade II listed building following a campaign by local Liberal Democrat councillor Victor Chamberlain.

Southern Cemetery

Southern Cemetery is the largest municipal cemetery in the United Kingdom and contains many notable burials, including industrialist John Rylands and broadcaster and music impresario Tony Wilson. The burial ground originally occupied  of land that cost Manchester Corporation £38,340 in 1872. Its cemetery buildings were designed by architect H J Paull and its layout is attributed to the city surveyor, James Gascoigne Lynde. The cemetery opened on 9 October 1879 and had mortuary chapels for Anglicans, Nonconformists, and Roman Catholics linked by an elliptical drive and a Jewish chapel at the west corner of the site. The original cemetery is registered by English Heritage in the Register of Historic Parks and Gardens for its historic interest and the mortuary chapels and other structures are listed buildings.

Transport

In the 19th century, public transport was provided by the railway through the southern suburbs of Manchester and horse buses from Chorlton Green towards Manchester city centre. In the early 20th century the electric tramway reached Chorlton. Mauldeth Road West's dual-carriageway had a central strip intended for use as a double-track for electric trams. Trams remained in service until January 1949. Passenger railway services ended in 1967 when Chorlton-cum-Hardy station closed.

Most bus services are operated by Stagecoach Manchester on high-frequency services into the city centre.

From 1992 conversion of the former railway line through Chorlton to a Metrolink line was planned, but failed to secure funding. Work started in 2010, and the line opened on 7 July 2011, providing residents with a rail journey into the city centre for the first time in 44 years. The tram stop is on the site of the old railway station. Services terminated one stop further south at St Werburgh's Road, on the site of the old Chorlton Junction signal box, but in 2013 services were extended to East Didsbury and in November 2014 to Manchester Airport

Religion
Since 1847 Chorlton has been in the Anglican Diocese of Manchester and Archdeaconry of Manchester; and since 1850, in the Roman Catholic Diocese of Salford. Between 1541 and 1847 it was in the Diocese of Chester and before that the Diocese of Lichfield and Coventry. In medieval times the parish church was the Collegiate Church in Manchester, dependent on which was the chapel of ease at Didsbury.

A timber-framed chapel dedicated to St Clement provided by the Barlow family in 1512 was used until 1779 when it was replaced by a brick chapel, probably on the same site. (Its Grade II listed gatehouse and bell turret remain at Chorlton Green.) Chorlton was designated a parish in 1839 and by 1860 the chapel was deemed inadequate for the expanding population. Lord Egerton provided land for a replacement but not all parishioners supported the proposal and the old chapel remained after the new church was completed in 1866. After the old chapel was demolished in 1949 St Clement's Church became the parish church.

In 1898 a new parish was established consisting of part of St Clement's parish and some others. The foundation stone of St Werburgh's Church was laid on 5 November 1899, its chancel and transepts dedicated in 1900, it was completed and opened on 1 June 1902 and consecrated 15 July 1902.

A Methodist chapel was built in about 1805 and replaced by a larger building in 1827. It moved to Manchester Road in 1873 when the neo-Gothic chapel was built. It has a memorial to those who lost their lives in the First World War in the grounds. Manley Park Methodist Church was established in a tin tabernacle in 1905. The present building opened in 1910. A smaller chapel was used by Welsh Methodists. A Congregational Chapel opened in 1883 was replaced in 1894 and became the United Reformed Church, the MacFadyen Memorial Church, but was demolished and its congregation meets in the church hall. Other denominations established churches: the Unitarians in Wilbraham Road in 1901; the Macpherson Memorial Primitive Methodist Church was built in 1896 and enlarged in 1908; the Baptist Maclaren Memorial Church in 1907; the Presbyterians in 1908; and the Emmanuel Free Church in 1909. The Unitarian and Baptist Chapels have been demolished, although their congregations are still in existence. The Congregationalists and Baptists have joined the United Reformed Church in the former Congregational church hall. Chorlton Evangelical Church (founded 1930) meets at Ivygreen Road; its present building was opened in 1951.

A Roman Catholic mission began in 1892 at St Peter's Chapel in Barlow Moor Road and another was established at St. Augustine's in High Lane. A new church was built in 1927 when the parish became St. John's. St Ambrose of Milan was founded in 1932 at Barlow Moor and new church opened in 1958. The architects were Reynolds & Stone. Its dedication to St Ambrose of Milan was chosen because St Ambrose Barlow's birthplace was in the parish.

The present-day population includes many Muslims, mostly of south Asian origin. There are mosques in Whalley Range and an Islamic high school for girls in Chorlton.

There are small numbers of Buddhists: one congregation uses the former Primitive Methodist Chapel and another, the Vairochana Buddhist Centre. The oldest, founded 1975, belongs to the Kagyu Ling school of Tibetan Buddhism. The Manchester Centre for Buddhist Meditation, High Lane, Chorlton, was used by the UK Samatha Association from the 1980s and established as such after its purchase by the Association. This centre supports local Buddhist meditation in the Theravada Buddhist tradition.

Education

Sir Nicholas Mosley of Hough End Hall who died in 1612, left £100, £5 a year for 20 years, to pay for a schoolmaster at Chorlton Chapel. The Wesleyan Methodists began a Sunday school and day school in about 1810, whereas the Anglican Sunday school did not begin until a later date. In 1845 the Rev. William Birley was responsible for building a Church School at Chorlton Green. When the building was found to be inadequate it was replaced by a new school on the site in 1879. A number of private schools existed in the late 19th century including C. C. Dadley's grammar school and Tom Mostyn's art school. In 1898 a school was under construction for the Roman Catholic parish of St Augustine and in 1901 a new church school was built at St Clement's Road and the old building was used for infants and juniors until this was no longer necessary. In 1904, when Chorlton was incorporated into Manchester, a municipal school was opened and moved to its permanent premises in Oswald Road in 1909.

The secondary schools in Chorlton are Loreto High School, CHS South and Chorlton High School. Chorlton High School, formerly Chorlton Grammar School, opened in 1925.

Sport and recreation

In the early 19th century bull-baiting, badger-baiting and cockfighting were popular but were outlawed by an Act of Parliament of 1835 and the last bull-baiting in Chorlton is recorded the same year. Prize-fighting, horse and foot racing, and wrestling took place on the meadows and led to disorder. If the forces of law and order appeared participants and spectators could escape across the Mersey into Cheshire and continue their sport. Horse races are said to have been held on land now part of Chorlton Park in the 16th century.

After the Second World War the Chorltonville owners' committee sold the recreation area and tennis courts which were absorbed into gardens of adjoining houses, and the rest became a football ground, now owned by West Didsbury & Chorlton A.F.C.
Broughton Park RUFC which was established in 1882 in Salford, moved to Hough End in 2004.

South West Manchester Cricket Club, one of the oldest in the Manchester area, are members of the Saddleworth & District Cricket League: the ground is at Ellesmere Road North, the old clubhouse is what was Hobson's Hall Farm. Chorlton-cum-Hardy Cricket Club is based at Hardy Lane.

An area of what is now Chorlton Park was used many centuries ago for horse racing. As a public park, it dates from 1928: there are gardens, many trees, and recreational facilities. The Recreation Ground, Beech Park, was opened in 1896, donated to the community by Lord Egerton.

Longford Park also is the home of Trafford Athletics Club. There is a synthetic six-lane track that is used heavily in the summer for regional competitions and British Milers' Club meets. Below the main stand is Longfords Gym, run in association with the Athletics Club. There is an 18-hole free to play disc golf course, community football pitches and all-weather tennis courts.

The first part of the Chorlton Cycleway has been delivered with Dutch-style junctions.

Culture
A number of poets and minor publishers of poetry were active in the late 20th century and a poetry group meets at Chorlton Library. There are three amateur dramatic societies that rehearse and perform in Chorlton.

The Beech Road Festival took place on Beech Road, Beech Road Park and Chorlton Green in June or July, with commercial and educational stalls, entertainments and live music and a tug-of-war competition. The festival first began in 1991, when two regulars from the Bowling Green Hotel came up with idea of hiring an articulated truck, a sound system and some generators for local acts Rattle 'n' Reel, Hectors House and Toss The Feathers to play on the August bank holiday Sunday on the rec (Beech Road Park), there was a good crowd and the first tug-of-war competition. Unfortunately, it has not taken place since 2011, when a combination of sunny weather and good social media marketing meant the event was attended by an unexpectedly large crowd estimated at 20,000 people, leading to a number of incidents which threatened to overstretch the modest police presence of eight officers at the event. As a result, The Association of Beech Road Traders – the organisation which ran the festival in order to raise money for nearby Beech Road Park – made the unanimous decision to cancel the festival indefinitely.

The Unity Festival takes place in Chorlton Park, encouraging racial and cultural unity and provides a platform for performances by dancers, musicians and singers. Chorlton Big Green Festival takes place in late March/April combining live music, dancing, food, real ale, cider, arts and crafts, workshops, cycling and films. It aims to encourage sustainable living and has a different theme each year.

The Chorlton Arts Festival in May generally features a programme of events over nine days; in 2020, it was shifted to online due to the COVID-19 pandemic. The Chorlton Book Festival takes place over two weeks in the autumn. Chorlton takes part in the Manchester Food & Drink Festival in early October, and in 2013 the inaugural Chorlton Coffee Festival was held in June.

Cinemas and dance halls
Several cinemas opened in the first half of the 20th century. The first was the Chorlton Pavilion bought by H. D. Moorhouse in 1909 followed by the Palais de Luxe in 1915. It closed in 1958. The Rivoli opened on Barlow Moor Road in 1936 and changed its name several times to the Essoldo, the Classic and the Shalimar before closing in the 1980s. Likewise, the Majestic on Manchester Road had several names, the Savoy, the ABC and the Gaumont. There are no remaining cinemas in Chorlton, with the nearest being situated in Manchester city centre, East Didsbury or at the nearby Trafford Centre.

The Chorlton Palais de Danse in Barlow Moor Road became a nightclub before the site was redeveloped.

Creative and performing arts
Until October 2009 Chorlton was the location for the Cosgrove Hall animation studios where the children's series Chorlton and the Wheelies, Jamie and the Magic Torch, The BFG, The Wind in the Willows, Noddy's Toyland Adventures, Oakie Doke, Cockleshell Bay, Lavender Castle, Danger Mouse and Count Duckula were created. The area is used by film crews for TV locations, such as The Second Coming, as it retains much of its original Victorian architecture. White Van Man used several Chorlton locations and was shown on BBC3 Television in 2010.
Chorlton Cum-Hardy was also the home to Bulman a British television crime drama series from 1985 to 1987 created by Murray Smith.

Public services
Policing in Chorlton-cum-Hardy is the responsibility of the Greater Manchester Police (GMP); the suburb is in the GMP's South Manchester Division. Chorlton Police Station was situated on Barlow Moor Road, between Beech Road and the bus station, until it closed in October 2011. The first police station was established in Beech Road in 1885 by the Lancashire Constabulary and was replaced by the one, now closed, on Barlow Moor Road in the 1960s.

Waste management is co-ordinated by the local authority via the Greater Manchester Waste Disposal Authority.

In popular culture
The ITV sitcom The Cuckoo Waltz, starring Diane Keen, David Roper and Lewis Collins was nominally set in Chorlton-cum-Hardy, referenced in certain episodes.

Notable people
George Arthurs (1875–1944), librettist and songwriter
 Sir Matt Busby, (1909–1994) lived at 214 Kings Road in Chorlton-cum-Hardy for over 30 years. He was the manager of Manchester United F.C.
Quentin Crisp, author, raconteur and notable gay icon died in Chorlton in 1999, while visiting the UK on the eve of performing his one-man show, and was cremated at Southern Cemetery.
Alderman James Herbert Dawson, one of the promoters of the garden suburb at Chorltonville, was a long-serving councillor in Manchester and in Lytham St Annes.
Alcock and Brown, the first men to fly across the Atlantic Ocean, were long-term residents, and a house in Oswald Road is marked by a blue plaque in honour of Brown.
Sir Robert Mark, Commissioner of the Metropolitan Police, began his career with the Manchester City Police. He was born in Chorlton and was resident there until his move to Leicester in 1957.
George Best, footballer, spent ten years on and off lodging at Aycliffe Avenue.
Michael Kennedy (1926–2014), the music critic, author and journalist, was born in Chorlton.
 The Bee Gees spent nearly eight years of their childhood living in 51, Keppel Road, Chorlton. In 1958, shortly after the birth of their brother Andy Gibb, who also became a major musical act, they moved to Australia. The street also lent its name to a Bee Gees documentary in 1997.
 Damon Gough, professionally known as Badly Drawn Boy, indie songwriter and multi-instrumentalist.
 Dr Aneez Esmail, Associate Vice President, University of Manchester. First British Pakistani to hold an executive position at a Russell Group University.
 Margaret Lacey (1911–1988), actress, born in Chorlton-cum-Hardy
 Charles Wheeler Locke M.B.E. (1908-1980), Chief Warden of Manchester in WW2, lived in Chorlton
 Joe Mercer O.B.E. (1914-1990) lived at 71 St Werburgh's Road, while he managed Manchester City 
 Paul Rawlinson  (1963-2019), international lawyer, lived at 120 St Werburgh's Road, until the age of 18. He was the first British global chair of the global law firm Baker McKenzie. 

Other residents have included locally-born actor Warren Clarke who lived at 8, Grindley Avenue, and Freddie Garrity (of Freddie and the Dreamers). The actress Doris Speed lived in Sibson Road, and for over twenty years she played Annie Walker, landlady of the Rovers Return in the ITV soap opera Coronation Street. Harry H. Corbett, of Steptoe and Son fame, started out in the Conservative Club's Dramatic Society.  Harry Goodwin is known for his photographs of pop musicians and sports personalities. He was the resident photographer of the BBC Television programme Top of the Pops from its inception in 1964 until 1973. In 2007 Yoko Ono opened a permanent exhibit of Goodwin's photographs at Liverpool John Lennon Airport. This happened because Neil Pakey found some of Goodwin's photographs on display in a local barber's.
Brian Cosgrove, he and his business partner, Mark Hall founded the popular iconic animation studio Cosgrove Hall Films for Thames Television, a franchise holder of ITV, in this place.

See also
Listed buildings in Manchester-M21
Merseybank
Parks and open spaces in Chorlton-cum-Hardy

Notes

References

Bibliography
Burton, Nick (ed.) Chorlton cum Hardy and Stretford, 1905. (Old Ordnance Survey maps. Lancashire sheet 111.10.) Gateshead: Alan Godfrey (includes historical survey and extracts from Slater's directory, 1910)

Further reading

External links

Chorlton Civic Society
Original Chorltonville Brochure
Old photographs of Chorlton
Chorlton cum Hardy local history
Ward maps

Areas of Manchester
Irish diaspora in England
Manchester City Council Wards